19 Armoured Regiment is an armoured regiment of the Indian Army.

Formation 
19 Armoured Regiment was raised on 25 March 1985 at Ahmednagar. It has an all-India all-class composition, drawing troops from various castes and religions.

History 
The Regiment was presented the ‘President’s Standards’ at Babina, Uttar Pradesh on 19 October 2010 by the then President of India, Mrs. Prathiba Patil. Five armoured regiments of the 31 Armoured Division (19, 12, 13, 83 and 15 Armoured Regiments) were awarded the colours.

The Regiment had the honour of participating in the Republic Day parade in 2018.

Equipment
The Regiment was equipped with Vijayanta tanks at its raising. It is presently equipped with the T-90 tanks.

Regimental Insignia
The Regimental insignia consists of crossed lances with pennons, overlaid with the numeral "19" inscribed on the crossing of the lances, mounted by an armoured fist and a scroll at the base with the words " कवचित  रेजिमेंट" (Kavachit Regiment, meaning Armoured Regiment) in Devanagari script.

The motto of the regiment is ‘विद्या  विनय  वीरता’ (Vidya, Vinay, Veerta), which translates to ‘Knowledge, Humility and Bravery’.

External links

 Youtube video : T-90 tanks of the 19 Armoured Regiment during the 2018 Republic Day Parade

References

Military units and formations established in 1985
Armoured and cavalry regiments of the Indian Army from 1947